Pseudobutyrivibrio xylanivorans is a species of butyrate-producing bacteria from the rumen. It is Gram-negative, anaerobic, non-spore-forming, curved rod-shaped and motile by means of a single polar or subpolar flagellum. Its type strain is Mz 5T (=DSM 14809T =ATCC BAA-455T). xylanivorans means xylan-digesting.

References

Further reading

External links

LPSN
Type strain of Pseudobutyrivibrio xylanivorans at BacDive -  the Bacterial Diversity Metadatabase

Lachnospiraceae
Bacteria described in 2003